Tourza (Arabic: طورزا) is a municipality in the Bsharri District, North Governorate of Lebanon. The village is located near the towns of Mazraat En Nahr and Aabdine. The municipality is member of Federation of Bcharreh District Municipalities. In 2009, there were 2,194 voters in the town and that number rose to 2,220 in 2014. The town has one public and one private school, with approximately 317 students in the town.

References 

Populated places in the North Governorate
Bsharri District